Mesteacănu may refer to several places in Romania:

 Mesteacănu, a village in Almașu Commune, Sălaj County
 Mesteacănu, a village in Vizantea Livezi Commune, Vrancea County
 Mesteacănu, a tributary of the river Lotru in Vâlcea County

See also 
 Mesteacăn (disambiguation)